Thymine glycol (5,6-dihydroxy-5,6-dihydrothymine) is one of the principal DNA lesions that can be induced by oxidation and ionizing radiation.

Aging, stroke

The rate at which oxidative reactions generate thymine glycol and thymidine glycol in the DNA of humans is estimated to be about 300 per cell per day.  Oxidized DNA bases that are excised by DNA repair processes are excreted in urine.  On a body weight basis, mice excrete 18 times more thymine glycol plus thymidine glycol than humans, and monkeys four times more than humans.  It was proposed that rate of occurrence of oxidative DNA damages correlates with metabolic rate, and that a higher rate of oxidative damage might cause a higher rate of cellular aging.

Base excision repair is a major DNA repair pathway for removal of oxidative DNA damages. The rate of repair of thymine glycol damage in human fibroblasts was found to decrease with age.  Brain samples from humans who died of stroke were found to be deficient in base excision repair of thymine glycol as well as other types of oxidative damages.   It was suggested that impaired base excision repair is a risk factor for ischemic brain injury.

References

Pyrimidinediones
Vicinal diols